In mathematics, a matroid polytope, also called a matroid basis polytope (or basis matroid polytope) to distinguish it from other polytopes derived from a matroid, is a polytope constructed via the bases of a matroid.

Definition
Let  be a matroid on  elements.

The matroid polytope  is the convex hull of the set

Examples

 Let  be the rank 2 matroid on 4 elements with bases
 
That is, all 2-element subsets of   except .
 
 
These points form four equilateral triangles at point , therefore its convex hull is the square pyramid by definition.

The corresponding matroid polytope  is the octahedron.
 If  is the uniform matroid of rank  on  elements, then the matroid polytope  is the hypersimplex .

Properties 
In other words, the edges of  correspond exactly to the pairs of bases  that satisfy the basis exchange property:  for some  Because of this property, every edge length is the square root of two. More generally, the families of sets for which the convex hull of indicator vectors has edge lengths one or the square root of two are exactly the delta-matroids.
 Matroid polytopes are members of the family of generalized permutohedra.
 Let   be the rank function of a matroid .  The matroid polytope  can be written uniquely as a signed Minkowski sum of simplices:
 

Related polytopes

Independence matroid polytope 
The matroid independence polytope or independence matroid polytope is the convex hull of the set

The (basis) matroid polytope is a face of the independence matroid polytope.

Flag matroid polytope 
The flag matroid polytope is another polytope constructed from the bases of matroids. A flag  is a strictly increasing sequence

of finite sets. Let  be the cardinality of the set .

 

Such a collection of flags is a flag matroid .
For each flag  in a flag matroid , let  be the sum of the indicator vectors of each basis in 

 

Given a flag matroid , the flag matroid polytope  is the convex hull of the set

A flag matroid polytope can be written as a Minkowski sum of the (basis) matroid polytopes of the constituent matroids:

References 

Polytope
Polytopes